Yoshie Ōishi (12 February 1897 – 7 June 1971) was a Japanese politician. She was one of the first group of women elected to the House of Representatives in 1946.

Biography
Born in Kyoto Prefecture in 1897, Ōishi was educated at Shinai Girl's High School, from which she graduated in 1915. She became involved in the women's suffrage movement in Maizuru and later became a member of Kokumin Doshikai. She spent two years in the United States in the early 1930s, and then worked as an advisor to the Mukden edition of Mainichi Shimbun in Manchukuo, before returning to Japan. She became president of the New Japan Women's Association and the Maizur War Sufferer's Association.

Ōishi contested the 1946 general elections as an independent candidate in Kyoto, and was elected to the House of Representatives. After being elected, she joined the Japan Socialist Party, and was re-elected from Kyoto 2nd district in the 1947. She lost her seat in the 1955 elections, after which she moved to Fukaya. She died in 1971.

References

1897 births
Japanese suffragists
20th-century Japanese women politicians
20th-century Japanese politicians
Members of the House of Representatives (Japan)
Social Democratic Party (Japan) politicians
Rightist Socialist Party of Japan politicians
1971 deaths